Guioa venusta is a species of plant in the family Sapindaceae. It is endemic to West Papua (Indonesia).

References

venusta
Endemic flora of New Guinea
Flora of Western New Guinea
Trees of New Guinea
Vulnerable plants
Taxonomy articles created by Polbot